Balakhal is a semi-urban area in Chandpur District in the Chittagong Division of eastern Bangladesh.
It is under Haziganj Upazila and Municipality. It stands on the bank of the Dakatia River.

Infrastructure
 Railway Station
 Bus Stop
 Daily Marketplace (Bazar)
 Cumilla - Chandpur Road (R140)
 Balakhal - Ramchandrapur Road
 Balakhal- Kashimpur Road
Balakhal - Rampur Road
 Balakhal - Protappur Road
 Bridge on the Dakatia River

Institutions
 Intermediate and Degree College–1
 Technical College 
 High Schools - 2
 Boys Hostel
Boys School
Girls School
 Primary Schools - 3
 Madrasha–1
 Mosques - 10
 Eidgah
 Hindu Temples - 6
 Family planning clinics - 1
 Social Welfare Center
 Post Office 1
 Microwave Station 1
Rural electricity power station

Amenities
 Electricity from Rural Electrification Board
 Natural Gas supply for home and factory
 Water supply from municipality
 TV cable connection
 Home phone connection
 Ground transportations - bus, autos and train
 Playgrounds, Football and cricket fields

Shops and factories
 Internet Cafe, Computer Center, Cellular Centers, Photo and Multimedia Studios
 Restaurants and Sweetmeats
 Groceries and Confectionaries
 Clothing, Boutiques and utensils
 Live Poultry, Fish Market and Butcher Shops
 Tailors, Goldsmiths, Blacksmiths, Barber shops 
 Rural Doctors and Pharmacies
 Agriculture Supplies, Sanitary Supplies, Steel and Woodwork
 Bakery
 Ice cream factory
 Rice Mills
 Saw Mill

Attractions
 Boishakhi Mela on the Pohela Boishakh (Bengali new year)
 Big Dighis (lakes and lagoons)
 Big banyan trees
 Dakatia River
Ramchandrapur Bridge (Bakultola)

References

Populated places in Chandpur District